Gliophorus irrigatus is a species of agaric (gilled mushroom) in the family Hygrophoraceae. It has been given the recommended English name of slimy waxcap in the UK. The species is widespread in temperate regions, occurring in grassland in Europe and in woodland in North America and elsewhere.

Taxonomy
The species was first described in 1801 by the South African-born mycologist Christiaan Hendrik Persoon as Agaricus irrigatus. It was subsequently combined in a number of different genera, before being transferred to Hygrocybe in 1976. The specific epithet comes from Latin "irrigatus" (= watered or bedewed), with reference to the viscid coating of the fruit bodies.

Molecular research published in 2011, based on cladistic analysis of DNA sequences, showed that Hygrocybe irrigata did not belong in Hygrocybe sensu stricto and it was moved to the genus Gliophorus in 2013.

Description
Basidiocarps are agaricoid, up to 100 mm (4 in) tall, the cap convex at first and remaining convex or becoming flat when expanded, up to 50 mm (2 in) across. The cap surface is very viscid when damp, striate at the margin, and pale greyish brown. The lamellae (gills) are whitish to pale cap-coloured and more or less decurrent (widely attached to and running down the stipe). The stipe (stem) is very viscid when damp, smooth, cylindrical or compressed, and grey to cap-coloured. The spore print is white, the spores (under a microscope) smooth, inamyloid, ellipsoid, about 6.5 to 8.0 by 4.5 to 5.0 μm.

Distribution and habitat
The slimy waxcap has been recorded in Europe, Central and North America, northern Asia, and Australia. Like other waxcaps, it grows in old, unimproved, short-sward grassland (pastures and lawns) in Europe, but in woodland elsewhere. Recent research suggests waxcaps are neither mycorrhizal nor saprotrophic but may be associated with mosses.

Conservation
In Europe, Gliophorus irrigatus is typical of waxcap grasslands, a declining habitat due to changing agricultural practices. The slimy waxcap is one of the commoner species, however, only appearing on the red lists of threatened fungi in a few countries, including the Czech Republic, Germany (Bavaria), and Poland.

References

Fungi described in 1801
Fungi of Europe
Fungi of North America
Hygrophoraceae
Taxa named by Christiaan Hendrik Persoon